Stateless is the self-titled and debut studio album released  by Stateless on German electronica label !K7. The album includes besides newly written and recorded songs, all tracks previously released on The Bloodstream EP (2005) and debut-single "Down Here" (2004). The tracks "Exit", "Prism #1" and "Bloodstream" were released as singles promoting the album.

The artwork for the album and singles was created by Non-Format.

The song "Bloodstream" was used in the first season finale of the American TV show The Vampire Diaries and in the Season 4 finale of the American TV show The Blacklist (TV series).

Track listing

Release history

References

Stateless (band) albums
2007 debut albums
Albums produced by Jim Abbiss
Albums recorded at Rockfield Studios